Amjad Khan may refer to:

 Amjad Khan (actor) (1940–1992), Indian actor and director
 Amjad Khan (American cricketer) (born 1966), Indian-born American cricketer
 Amjad Khan (Emirati cricketer) (born 1989), Emirati cricketer
 Amjad Khan (English cricketer) (born 1980), Danish-born English cricketer
 Amjad Khan (squash player) (born 1978), Pakistani squash player
 Amjad Ali Khan (born 1945), Indian classical musician
 Amjad Ali Khan (Indian vocalist) (born 1980), Indian classical vocalist
 Amjad Ali Khan (politician) (born 1972), Pakistani politician
 Amjad Farooq Khan (born 1950), Pakistani politician
 Amjad Mohammed Khan, Pakistani anaesthesiologist, ex-husband of Aafia Siddiqui